CSIRAC (Commonwealth Scientific and Industrial Research Automatic Computer), originally known as CSIR Mk 1, was Australia's first digital computer, and the fifth stored program computer in the world. It is the oldest surviving first-generation electronic computer
(the Zuse Z4 at the Deutsches Museum is older, but was electro-mechanical, not electronic), and was the first in the world to play digital music.

After being exhibited at Melbourne Museum for many years, it was relocated to Scienceworks in 2018 and is now on permanent display in the Think Ahead gallery.
A comprehensive source of information about the CSIRA collection, its contributors and related topics is available from Museums Victoria on their Collections website.

History
The CSIRAC was constructed by a team led by Trevor Pearcey and Maston Beard, working in large part independently of similar efforts across Europe and the United States, and ran its first test program (multiplication of numbers) sometime in November 1949. In restricted operation from late 1950, publicly demonstrated and operational in 1951.

Design
The machine was fairly representative of first-generation valve-driven computer designs. It used mercury acoustic delay lines as its primary data storage, with a typical capacity of 768 20-bit words, supplemented by a parallel disk-type device with a total 4096-word capacity and an access time of 10 milliseconds. Its memory clock ran at 1000 Hz, and the control unit, synchronized to the clock, took two cycles to execute an instruction (later the speed was doubled to one cycle per instruction). The bus (termed the "digit trunk" in their design) is unusual compared to most computers in that it was serial—it transferred one bit at a time.

Most of CSIRAC's approximately 2000 valves were of the types 6SN7, 6V6, EA50 diodes and KT66. George Semkiw later redesigned the drum-read electronics to use germanium transistors.

Input to the machine was performed in the form of punched paper tape, after experiments with punch cards proved unsatisfactory.  The machine was controlled through a console which allowed programs to be stepped through one instruction at a time, and featured CRT displays which showed the contents of registers.  Output was through a standard teleprinter or to punch tape.

The instruction set supported the basic set of arithmetic and logical operations, as well as conditional and relative jumps (making it possible to write a library of subroutines). Instructions consisted of three components: a 5-bit "destination" P1-P5, a 5-bit "source" P6-P10, and a 10-bit "address" P11-P20. For instructions that used the main store, the six bits P15-P20 selected one of the 64 logical delay lines. Bits P11-P14 determined the time at which 20 bits of data were written to or extracted from the delay line, and thus represented address of a word within the selected delay line. There were 32 destination gates and 32 source gates; the 10 address bits identified a data word within the store if either the source or destination required access to the store. The total number of source and destination combinations, or different instruction functions, was 1024, although only about 256 of these were used often. The machine had three 20-bit registers (A, B and C), two of which were involved in multiplication, one 10-bit register which could link to either half of a word, and a group of 16 20-bit registers, addressed via bits P11-P14. In addition the 20-bit program counter (S register), and the instruction register (K) were accessible.

The machine, like all machines of the era, had no operating system.  A high-level interpreted programming language called INTERPROGRAM was developed in 1960 by Geoff Hill. It was similar to early forms of BASIC, which was designed in 1963 for the 20-bit transistorized GE-200 series.

In 1950 CSIRAC was used to play music, the first known use of a digital computer for the purpose. The music was never recorded, but it has been accurately reconstructed.

In 1955, with the CSIRO's decision that computing research was outside its purview, the machine was transferred from its home at the Radiophysics Laboratory at the CSIRO in Sydney, to the University of Melbourne, where it formed Australia's only academic computing facility until late 1956.  Many pioneers of computer use in Australia had their first exposure to computing there.

Preservation
In 1964, CSIRAC was shut down for the last time.  Its historical significance was already recognised at that stage, and it was placed in storage with plans for its later exhibition in a museum.

The machine was stored in a warehouse through the 1960s and 1970s, before being set up for exhibit at Caulfield Institute of Technology (later the Caulfield Campus of Chisholm Institute of Technology, and later again the Caulfield Campus of Monash University) from 1980 to 1992.  It was then returned to storage.

Interest in the machine was revived in the 1990s, as it was realised that many of its developers were aging and history was being lost forever.  A conference about the machine was held in 1996.

The machine found a permanent home with Museums Victoria in 2000. It has not been operable since its shutdown, but many of the programs that ran on it have been preserved, and an emulator has been written for it. The curators have decided that, aside from the cost of restoring the device, the huge number of repairs that would be required to make it safe to operate (CSIRAC used 30 kilowatts of power in operation) would detract from its historical authenticity.

After being exhibited at Melbourne Museum for many years, it was relocated to Scienceworks in 2018 and is now on permanent display in the Think Ahead gallery.

CSIRAC is listed on the Victorian Heritage Register and is included in a Heritage Overlay.

It is listed as a National Engineering Landmark by Engineers Australia as part of its Engineering Heritage Recognition Program.

See also 
 Computer music
 Electronic music
 History of computing hardware
 List of vacuum tube computers
 SILLIAC – Sydney University's second computer

References 
References

 

Bibliography

 
 
 
  Alt URL  – A timeline and history of CSIRAC, as well as a collection of presentations from the 1996 conference on the machine.

External links 
 CSIRAC homepage — From the Computation Laboratory at the University of Melbourne's Department of Computing and Information Systems
 Australian National Treasure — CSIRAC — Television segment on CSIRAC
 The Computer 'CSIRAC' — 1965 film
 The Music Of CSIRAC — Paul Doornbusch's book review (in Spanish) Google translation
 CSIRAC Emulator in Java — Description of Architecture, Programming details, and a Java Emulator
  – Trevor Pearcey interview, MP3s of all of the music played by CSIRAC

1940s computers
One-of-a-kind computers
Vacuum tube computers
Computer-related introductions in 1949
Science and technology in Australia
Heritage sites in Melbourne
Recipients of Engineers Australia engineering heritage markers
City of Hobsons Bay
20-bit computers